That Day may refer to:
That Day (film), a 2003 French film.
"That Day" (Natalie Imbruglia song), 2001
"That Day" (One Buck Short song), 2003
That Day: Pictures in the American West, a 2015 book by American photographer Laura Wilson